Catherine Tasca (born 13 December 1941 in Lyon) was a member of the Senate of France, representing the Yvelines department from 2004 to 2017.  She is a member of the Socialist Party, and served as the Senate's vice-president. From 2000 to 2002 she was Minister of Culture in France.

Family life
She is the daughter of Angelo Tasca, a former founding member of the Communist Party of Italy from Piedmont. After expulsion from the Communist Party, Angelo went into exile in France. There he joined the French Section of the Workers' International in 1934 and later supported the Vichy regime in the 1940s.

References
Page on the Senate website

1941 births
Living people
Politicians from Lyon
French people of Italian descent
People of Piedmontese descent
Unified Socialist Party (France) politicians
Socialist Party (France) politicians
French Ministers of Culture
Deputies of the 11th National Assembly of the French Fifth Republic
French Senators of the Fifth Republic
Senators of Yvelines
Women members of the National Assembly (France)
Women members of the Senate (France)
Women government ministers of France
Sciences Po alumni
École nationale d'administration alumni
20th-century French women politicians
21st-century French women politicians